Medieval films imagine and portray the Middle Ages through the visual, audio and thematic forms of cinema.

Background

The 20th century is not the first to create images of life during medieval times. The Middle Ages ended over five centuries ago and each century has imagined, portrayed and depicted the Middle Ages through painting, architecture, poetry, music and novel. In the 20th century, film has defined Medieval history perhaps more so than any other medium. While the conclusions of academic research and findings of archeology have advanced knowledge of the Middle Ages, nothing has had more widespread influence on more people than the images created by film. Just as most people's perceptions of the American Wild West were drawn from cinema, versus source material or academic research, so too most peoples perceptions of the Middle Ages were influenced by the powerful narratives and images of film.

If film was the most influential medium, Hollywood was the most influential image maker. Hollywood films reached a global audience through big budget productions, and equally big distribution and advertising channels. Hollywood adapted works of the  Romanticism movement to the screen, seamlessly forging a bridge between Romanticized historical novels, operas, paintings, and music of the 19th century onto film in the 20th. The ideals of the Romantics were fully realized on the screen in such influential works as Ivanhoe (1952) and El Cid (1961) which belong to the same late Romantic culture in their music, imagery and themes.

Strong cinematic images of the Middle Ages can be found in European films. Influential European films included Fritz Lang's two-film series Die Nibelungen: Siegfrieds Tod and Die Nibelungen: Kriemhilds Rache (1924),  Sergei Eisenstein's Alexander Nevsky (1938) and Ingmar Bergman's The Seventh Seal (1957), while in France there were many versions of the story of Joan of Arc.

The first Medieval film was also one of the earliest films ever made, Jeanne d'Arc released in 1900. The first Robin Hood film dates to 1907 and was called Robin Hood and His Merry Men.

Historiography and historiophoty
The historiography and historiophoty of medieval film is a new field of study. Historiophoty, the study of history through film, was coined by noted historiographer Hayden White in Historiography and Historiophoty (1988) in which he theorized that one of the main sources of friction between History and Film is the problem of translating from a written discourse (hence the -graphy) to a visual one (-photy). The French historian Marc Ferro had already devoted his seminal work Cinéma et Histoire (1977) to precisely this question, he asks in Chapter 16, "Can a filmic writing of History exist?" 

Although in general terms the relationship between film and history has been a subject of interest since as long as films have been made, it was only in the last decade of the 20th century that medievalists paid attention to film as a serious means of learning about the Middle Ages. As Arthur Lindley said in 1998 "One could note the absence of books by medievalists as well as books of any kind devoted to medieval film," however he prophetically observed "The situation may be beginning to change". This change took place in part by the recognition of the complex relationship between historiography and cinematic history, since the publication of works such as Norman Cantor's Inventing the Middle Ages in 1991 demonstrated the extent of the influence of historiography on Medieval History. Harnessing the work of the earlier New Historicism, this emergent field of historiography began to challenge the hegemony of Medieval historians over the history which they narrate, and opens the door for new modes of thinking by the proposition that "we cannot interpret medieval culture, or any historical culture, except through the prism of the dominant concepts of our own thought worlds."

Until the publication of Kevin J. Harty's book The Reel Middle Ages (1999) there had been no comprehensive survey of medieval films, and John Aberth's book A Knight at the Movies (2003) can probably be called the first book in English dedicated solely to the subject of history and medieval history on film. One year later, in 2004, the eminent French historian François Amy de la Bretèque published his  L'Imaginaire médiéval dans le cinéma occidental, in which he proposes a number of useful theories to finally break out of the circle of historiography vs historiophoty. One of the most pervasive of these, and one picked up in Robert Rosenstone's History on Film/Film on History (2006) is that both History and Film are ways of narrating the past, both equally susceptible in theory (though not in practice) to perversion. As Rosenstone observes, "we always violate the past, even as we attempt to preserve its memory in whatever medium we use... Yet this violation is inevitable, part of the price of our attempts at understanding the vanished world of our forebears."  

These ideas were picked up by later authors and incorporated into criticism of medieval films, most notably by Nickolas Haydock and Andrew B.R. Elliott, in order to establish a starting position which accepts the inevitable falsification of the period in film, and instead focuses on what these changes reveal about modern attitudes to the period. Haydock achieves this by arguing for a "medieval imaginary", a Lacanian idea which suggests that there exists a collected body of ideas about the Middle Ages to which filmmakers (and perhaps historians themselves) refer. Elliott, on the other hand, suggests that modern images of the period are based on semiotics, in which both images and paradigms are signifiers of an earlier medieval referent. Both of these ideas connect back to the theory of historiophoty, in that they rely on a kind of history which is written in images, and not in words. 

Historiophoty today, therefore, is an ongoing process which recognises the inherent problems in bringing history in general- and medieval history in particular, given its vulnerability to be hijacked by the fantasy genre- to life on the screen. One of the major breakthroughs has been in finally overcoming the reluctance to accept film as history by the recognition that it is not a 'type' of history, but rather that cinema makes use of its own cinematic techniques in order to narrate its history, proposing not a challenge to historical records but simply an alternative way of narrating them.

Select films

At over 900 films listed by Harty in 1999, it is beyond the scope of this article to create a complete list. Listed here are some of the best and most significant films in both quality and historical accuracy as determined by a consensus poll of medieval students and teachers.

See also
 Middle Ages in history
 List of films based on Arthurian legend
 List of films and television series featuring Robin Hood
 Joan of Arc in film

Notes

Further reading
 Books
 John Aberth, A Knight at the Movies: Medieval History on Film, 2003, .
 Anke Bernau and Bettina Bildhauer, ed. Medieval Film (Manchester: Manchester UP, 2009), 
 Amy de La Bretèque, L'imaginaire Médiéval Dans Le Cinéma Occidental (Paris: Champion, 2004).
 Richard Burt, Medieval and Early Modern Film and Media (Palgrave MacMillan, 2008) 
 Andrew Elliott, Remaking the Middle Ages: The Methods of Cinema and History in Portraying the Medieval World (Jefferson: McFarland, 2011) 
 Nickolas Haydock, Movie Medievalism: The Imaginary Middle Ages (McFarland 2008). 
 Nickolas Haydock and Edward L. Risden, eds. Hollywood in the Holy Land: Essays on Film Depictions of the Crusades and Christian-Muslim Clashes (McFarland, 2008).
 Laurie Finke and Martin B Shichtman, Cinematic Illuminations: The Middle Ages on Film (The Johns Hopkins University Press 2009) 
 Articles
 Richard Burt, "Getting Schmedieval: Of Manuscript and Film Parodies, Prologues, and Paratexts," special issue of Exemplaria on "Movie Medievalism," 19.2. (Summer 2007), 217–42, co-edited by Richard Burt and Nickolas Haydock.
 Richard Burt, "Re-embroidering the Bayeux Tapestry in Film and Media: the Flip Side of History in Opening and End Title Sequences," special issue of Exemplaria on "Movie Medievalism," 19.2. (Summer 2007), 327–50, co-edited by Richard Burt and Nickolas Haydock.
 Richard Burt, "Cutting and Running from the (Medieval) Middle East : The Uncanny Mises-hors-scène of Kingdom of Heaven's Double DVDs," Babel, N° 15, 1er semestre (2007), 247–298.
 "Richard Burt, "Border Skirmishes: Weaving Around the Bayeux Tapestry and Cinema in Robin Hood, Prince of Thieves and El Cid ," in Medieval Film, ed. Anke Bernau and Bettina Bildhauer (Manchester: Manchester UP, 2009), 158–181.
 Nickolas Haydock, "Arthurian Melodrama, Chaucerian Spectacle and the Waywardness of Cinematic Pastiche in 'First Knight' and 'A Knight's Tale'" "Studies in Medievalism" 12 (2002): 5–38.
 Nickolas Haydock, "Shooting the Messenger: Luc Besson at War with Joan of Arc," special issue of Exemplaria on "Movie Medievalism," 19.2 (Summer 2007), co-edited by Richard Burt and Nickolas Haydock
 Nickolas Haydock, "Digital Divagations in a Hyperreal Camelot: Antoine Fuqua's 'King Arthur'" in Helen Fulton, ed. "Blackwell Companion to Arthurian Literature" (Blackwell, forthcoming 2008).
 David Williams, "Medieval Movies", The Yearbook of English Studies, 20 (1990), 1–32.
 Special issue of Cahiers de la Cinémathèque, "Le Moyen Âge au Cinéma", 42/43 (1985).
 Special issue of Babel on "Le Moyen Age mise-en-scène: Perspectives contemporaines," edited by Sandra Gorgievski and Xavier Leroux, N° 15, 1er semestre (2007).
 Filmographies and Bibliographies
 Kevin J. Harty, The Reel Middle Ages: American, Western and Eastern European, Middle Eastern and Asian films about Medieval Europe, 1999, . The first comprehensive survey of films of the European Middle Ages. Over 900 films.
 Paul Halsall, Medieval History in the Movies Online list of over 200 movies depicting Medieval history. From the Internet Medieval Sourcebook.
 Scott Manning, Medievalism on Screen: An Annotated Bibliography Online list of over 300 books and papers focused on medievalism in film and television. Last retrieved March 2018. 
 David J. Williams, "Medieval Movies: A Filmography", Film & History 29:1–2 (1999):20–32.
 University classes
 ENG 4133 Section 6439: Medieval and Early Modern Film and Media English Class at University of Florida by Dr. Richard Burt. Last retrieved April. 2009
 HIST 3220: Medieval Hollywood, a history and film course at Fordham University, taught by Dr. Esther Liberman Cuenca in Spring 2018
 Articles
 Arthur Lindley, "The ahistoricism of medieval film",  from Screening The Past Journal.
 David J. Williams, "Looking at the Middle Ages in the Cinema: An Overview." Film & History 29:1–2 (1999): 8–19.
 Martha Driver, "Writing About Medieval Movies: Authenticity and History.", Film & History 29:1–2 (1999):5–7.
 Online resources
 Medieval Hollywood (hosted by Fordham University)
 Medieval Studies at the Movies: An Online Reference Guide to Medieval Subjects on Film and Television (maintained by The Virtual Society for the Study of Popular Culture and the Middle Ages)
 Medieval War Movies

 
Middle Ages in popular culture